Chirakkal Raja (King of Chirakkal) was the title of the most senior king of the Chirakkal branch of the Palli division of the Kolathiri dynasty, who ruled over the erstwhile feudal state of Kolathunadu, which was located in the modern-day Indian state of Kerala.

See also 
 Arakkal Kingdom
 Kannur
 Nair

References 

People from Kannur
Nair